Rushan Range is a mountain range in south-western Pamir in Tajikistan, trending in the south-westerly direction from Sarez Lake toward Khorog, between Gunt River to the south and Bartang River to the north. About 120 km long, it reaches its highest elevation of 6,083 m at Patkhor Peak.

See also
List of mountains in Tajikistan

References

Mountain ranges of Tajikistan
Gorno-Badakhshan Autonomous Region
Pamir Mountains